The 2018 Campeón de Campeones was a Mexican football match that took place on July 15, 2018. The match was the fourth edition of the modern Campeón de Campeones, contested by the Liga MX season's Apertura and Clausura champions. The 2018 edition featured Tigres UANL, the Apertura champion, and Santos Laguna, the Clasura champion, at the StubHub Center in Carson, California, hosting for the third consecutive year. Like previous editions, the Campeón de Campeones was contested at a neutral venue in the United States and paired with the 2018 Supercopa MX.

As winners, UANL earned the right to play against MLS Cup winners Toronto FC in the inaugural edition of the Campeones Cup.

Match details

References

Campeón de Campeones
Campeón de Campeones
July 2018 sports events in Mexico